Gustavo Eliseo Morínigo Vázquez (born 23 January 1977) is a Paraguayan football manager and former player who played as a midfielder. He is the current manager of Ceará.

Club career
Born in Coronel Oviedo, Morínigo was a Libertad youth graduate. He made his first team debut in 1996, but left the club ahead of the 1999 season after signing for Guaraní.

Morínigo returned to Libertad for the 2001 campaign, and moved abroad in 2004 after agreeing to a contract with Argentinos Juniors. After featuring sparingly, he rejoined Libertad for a third spell in the following year.

On 25 January 2006, Morínigo moved to Deportivo Cali, but returned to his home country in the following year with Cerro Porteño. He subsequently signed for Nacional Asunción in 2007, and featured regularly until his retirement in 2011, aged 34.

International career
After representing Paraguay at under-20 level in the 1997 FIFA World Youth Championship, Morínigo made his full international debut on 27 January 2001, starting and scoring his side's only in a 1–1 draw against South Korea, for the year's Lunar New Year Cup.

Morínigo was also included in the final squads for the 2001 Copa América and the 2002 FIFA World Cup.

Managerial career

Nacional Asunción
On 16 April 2012, Morínigo was named in charge of his former club Nacional, after Javier Torrente resigned. Initially an interim, he was subsequently named manager on a permanent basis, and was chosen as the division's best coach in his first year.

In the 2014 Copa Libertadores, Morínigo led the side to the Finals, but lost to San Lorenzo. On 29 March 2015, he resigned.

Paraguay under-20 national team
On 31 August 2015, Morínigo was named manager of the Paraguay under-20 team. He was in charge of the side for two friendlies against Uruguay in March 2016 (4–3 win and 2–2 draw).

Cerro Porteño
On 15 April 2016, Morínigo returned to club duties after being appointed at the helm of another club he represented as a player, Cerro Porteño.

Return to Paraguay national teams
On 2 August 2016, Morínigo returned to the Paraguayan Football Association, after being named manager of the under-17 national team. On 29 January 2018, he was appointed interim manager of the full side after Francisco Arce left, and managed the side on two friendlies (0–1 against United States and 2–4 against Japan) before returning to his previous role.

Also a coordinator of the youth categories, Morínigo left the national sides on 18 August 2020.

Libertad
On 24 September 2020, Morínigo was appointed manager of his first senior club Libertad. He was sacked on 16 December, after the club's elimination in the 2020 Copa Libertadores.

Coritiba
On 4 January 2021, Morínigo signed with Brazilian club Coritiba. Despite suffering relegation, he was kept for the 2021 season and led the club back to the top tier.

On 30 November 2021, Morínigo renewed his contract with Coxa until the end of 2022. The following 14 August, he was sacked after entering the relegation zone.

Ceará
On 22 November 2022, Morínigo was named manager of Ceará, freshly relegated to the second level.

Managerial statistics

Honours

Player
Libertad
Paraguayan Primera División: 2002, 2003

Nacional Asunción
Paraguayan Primera División: 2009 Clausura, 2011 Apertura

Manager
Nacional Asunción
Paraguayan Primera División: 2013 Apertura

Coritiba
Campeonato Paranaense: Champion 2022

References

External links
 
 

1977 births
Living people
Paraguayan footballers
Paraguayan expatriate footballers
Paraguay international footballers
Paraguay under-20 international footballers
Paraguayan Primera División players
Argentine Primera División players
Categoría Primera A players
Club Libertad footballers
Club Guaraní players
Cerro Porteño players
Argentinos Juniors footballers
Deportivo Cali footballers
Club Nacional footballers
Expatriate footballers in Argentina
Expatriate footballers in Colombia
2001 Copa América players
2002 FIFA World Cup players
Paraguayan football managers
Club Nacional managers
Cerro Porteño managers
Association football midfielders
Coritiba Foot Ball Club managers
Ceará Sporting Club managers
Campeonato Brasileiro Série A managers
Campeonato Brasileiro Série B managers
Paraguayan expatriate football managers
Paraguayan expatriate sportspeople in Brazil
Expatriate football managers in Brazil
Paraguayan expatriate sportspeople in Argentina
Paraguayan expatriate sportspeople in Colombia
People from Caaguazú Department